Gia Gugushvili (born August 16, 1952) is a Georgian painter. Gia Gugushvili has produced nonfigurative as well as and minimalistic figurative compositions. His paintings are in museums and private collections all over the world.

Gia Gugushvili was born in Tbilisi. Graduated from the Tbilisi State Academy of Arts in 1977, where he currently holds the rector's position.

External links 
 Gia Gugushvili website
 Gertsev Gallery

Living people
1952 births
Painters from Georgia (country)
Academic staff of the Tbilisi State Academy of Arts
Tbilisi State Academy of Arts alumni